The Pyongyang Wheat Flour Factory() is a food processing factory in Samhŭng-dong, Man'gyŏngdae-guyŏk, P'yŏngyang, North Korea, mainly producing wheat flours, cookies, noodles and yeast. Originally built in 1976, It is served by rail, via Ch'ilgol station on the P'yŏngnam Line of the Korean State Railway.

References

Food and drink companies of North Korea